Nowhere is a Burning Man regional event in Spain, the biggest such regional event in Europe. It began in 2004 and is held annually in July in the Monegros Desert, located in Aragon in north-eastern Spain.

As an official regional event, Nowhere embraces the Burning Man principles. There are now around 3600 participants.

Features
Nowhere, like any Burning Man event, differs drastically from a music festival. Participation is the key element of the event and every attendant is expected to be involved in some way. Every task ranging from setup over maintaining the gate and perimeter up to first aid are volunteer based. There is no hired workforce aside from transport and logistics. Further, there are no scheduled performers or stages. Participants pay everything they contribute out of their own pocket as there is a strict rule of non commerce.

The landscape in the region of Monegros near Zaragoza is very dry and has a desert-like feel. Because it is Europe's largest burn event, Nowhere draws a very international crowd.

Barrios
A Barrio is a group of people who camp together, share infrastructure (kitchen, shade structure, etc.), and usually provide a service or attraction to the other participants. Barrios must register for the event and be assigned a location based on their size and sound zone preferences.

Barrios are a vital part of Nowhere and in 2018 the event hosted about 50 Barrios ranging from large sound camps to meditation camps. There are special Barrios like Werkhaus, which houses core event volunteers.

Freecampers 
Aside from the Barrios, there are many free camps for independent campers who are not affiliated with a Barrio where the majority of participants stay. They are referred to as Freecampers. In these areas, some Freecampers create their own shade structures and artwork. Others set up public areas within free camping areas. Middle of Frickin Freecamp is one of the most well-known (MOFF). MOFF, which has become a Nowhere institution, allows for gatherings and workshops.

No open fires
Nowhere does not include fire as a key feature of the event. Due to the dry area, which is on wildfire alert during the summer, it is strictly forbidden to have any kind open fire, therefore no art is set on fire. Fire spinning is restricted to a controlled area with fire marshals on duty. The burning of an effigy happened only once in 2016 after coming to an agreement with the local authorities.

Layout
Nowhere is created solely by the participants and driven by theme camps which are called Barrios. During the last incarnations Nowhere used a layout that reassembled a compass. This leads to an arrangement of the Barrios in a circle-like shape. Nowhere further divides the camps into four distinct sound zones reading from the blue zone which has a no sound policy to the red zone which hosts the dance camps. The same goes for the free camping areas.

Art
Art is the core of any burn event and Nowhere do not differ from this. Despite this large, scale artworks are rare at Nowhere. This is in part due to the strict non burning policy. The logistics of transport, setup, takedown and removal are more challenging to the participants because of this. Nowhere gives art grants for artists up to €3000. Artworks that are meant to be built on the playa require prior registration.

Public infrastructure
The event has a central shade structure known as Middle of Nowhere (MoN). It is a public space for relaxing, dancing, workshops and socializing. Other public infrastructure includes: NoInfo which serves as the general point of information, La Cantina which offers volunteers a free meal and Werkhaus, which sets up and keeps the public infrastructure intact.

History

The roots of Nowhere date back to 2002 when UK burners started to organize a decompression party in London. Nowhere has been held in several different locations in the Navarra and Aragon regions of Spain. It began in 2004, in Bardenas Reales. The current location is near Sariñena in the Province of Huesca. In 2016, attendance was about 1000 people; in 2017, about 1000 or 1500 people; and in 2018 and 2019 around 3600 participants. Nowhere was cancelled in 2020 and 2021. The 2022 event sold 3600 tickets.

Principles
Nowhere is built on the following key principles, inspired by Burning Man, however they have been adapted and re-edited in an inverted order:

 Self-expression – The freedom to be yourself: Be the person you are. Be the person you want to be. We respect and value you, and expect the same from you. You have the freedom to be yourself. Become who you are.
 Self-reliance – You are responsible for you, mentally and physically: From food and water to a hug or quiet, you need to take care of yourself in Nowhere’s challenging environment. Give yourself what you need – and ask others for help when you need it.
 No commerce – Forget about money – there’s nothing to buy: By removing commerce from our community, we create co-operation and participation. We plan ahead and work together. We live without money to remind us of what’s really important.
 Leave no trace – From dust to dust, we leave only footprints: We care for the environment, and we take care of our home. We clean up after ourselves; we leave nothing behind; we leave no trace we were there. From dust to dust, we leave only footprints.
 Participation Get involved – Nowhere is what we make it: The more you do, the more you get back. When you join others in play and in work, you are part of Nowhere. Your contribution is more valuable than you realise.
 Inclusion – Everyone is welcome to be a Nobody: We welcome everyone for their unique contribution to our community. Include others as you want to be included, with respect, consideration and tolerance.
 Gifting – We give our time, effort and gifts freely: We give to help others and because it makes us feel good. From a cold beer to digging out a tent pole to a small badge, our gifts are from our heart.
 Co-operation – Together we are stronger: From how we work together to how we communicate, co-operation is at Nowhere’s core. If we can make life easier, we will. If we can make life better, we will. Together we are stronger.
 Community – A family of individuals, we look after each other. A diverse group of separate self-reliant beings, we are united in our need to be part of something larger than ourselves. Community, others, self – united by tolerance and joy.
 Immediacy – Make now count: Be now here, be nowhere. Make now count. All this will soon be gone, so enjoy now. Experience, participate, be. This is all there is, so enjoy it!"

See also 
 List of regional Burning Man events

References

External links

 

Burning Man
Festivals in Spain
Counterculture festivals